The 2013–14 season is Hartlepool United's 93rd competitive season and their first season in League Two since 2006–07. Along with competing in League Two, the club will also participate in the FA Cup, League Cup and League Trophy. The season covers the period from 1 July 2013 to 30 June 2014.

Players

Current squad

Transfers

Transfers in

Transfers out

League Two

League table

Results summary

Results by matchday

Matches

FA Cup

League Cup

References 

Hartlepool United F.C. seasons
Hartlepool United
2010s in County Durham